Choutapally is a revenue village in the Parvathagiri mandal of Warangal district, Telangana, India. It is located 25 km from district headquarters, Warangal,   from Hyderabad. The village is known for rice production and quarry mining.

Agriculture
Rice cultivation is the major occupation of farmers. SRSP canals are the source of water for irrigation.

Transport facility
Warangal is well connected by road and rail to the rest of the state and country. From Warangal autos and TSRTC buses are available to the village.

Politics
Choutapally is a Gram Panchayat headed by a Sarpanch. It comes under Waradhanapet Assembly constituency.

References

Villages in Warangal district